Peter Costello (born 31 October 1969) is an English retired professional footballer. He played as a striker for clubs in England and Hong Kong. He was born in Halifax, West Yorkshire.

Career

Hong Kong
In September 1995 he moved to Hong Kong, joining Mansion FC. He celebrated Christmas by scoring the equaliser in the club's 1–1 draw with Golden on Christmas Day before linking up with Instant-Dict FC for the second stage of the season. He was released by Instant-Dict FC ahead of the 1996-97 season

 Bradford City (1988–90) 20 apps 2 goals
 Rochdale FC (1990) 34 apps 10 goals
 Peterborough United (1990–92) 8 apps 0 goals
 Lincoln City FC (loan) (1992) 3 apps 0 goal
 Lincoln City FC (1992–94) 38 apps 7 goals
 Dover Athletic (1994)
 Kettering Town (1994) 6 apps 4 goals
 Mansion FC (1995)
 Instant-Dict FC (1996) 4 goals
 Golden (1996–97) ? apps 2 goals
 Kettering Town (1997–98)
 Boston United (1998–2003) 18 apps 0 goals
 Stevenage Borough (2003–04) 15 apps 1 goal
 Cambridge City (2004-???)

References

External links

1969 births
Living people
English footballers
Expatriate footballers in Hong Kong
Peterborough United F.C. players
British people of Italian descent
English expatriate sportspeople in Hong Kong
English expatriate footballers
Association football midfielders